Irca's Romance (Czech: Irčin románek) is a 1936 Czech romance film directed by Karel Hašler and starring Jiřina Steimarová, Rolf Wanka and Theodor Pištěk. It was one of several Czech films of the 1930s to involve a trip to an Adriatic resort. A separate German-language version Escape to the Adriatic was made in a co-production with Austria.

It was shot at the Barrandov Studios in Prague.

Cast
 Rolf Wanka as Lexa Hora
 Jiřina Steimarová as Irča Minovská 
 Theodor Pištěk as Tomáš Minovský
 František Paul as Ing. Harry Peters
 Truda Grosslichtová as Singer Lola 
 Antonie Nedošinská as Šulcová 
 Čeněk Šlégl as Engineer
 Jan W. Speerger as Kraus 
 Jan Sviták as Private detective
 Eliška Pleyová as Bar Lady
 Ella Nollová as Landlady
 Běla Tringlerová as Boarding school student
 Eva Prchlíková as Boarding school student
 Milka Balek-Brodská as Director
 Rudolf Maria Mandée as Pianist
 Bohumil Hes as Tourist

References

Bibliography 
 Leen Engelen & Kris Van Heuckelom. European Cinema after the Wall: Screening East-West Mobility. Rowman & Littlefield, 2013.

External links 
 

1936 films
Czech romantic drama films
1936 romantic drama films
1930s Czech-language films
Films directed by Karel Hašler
Films shot at Barrandov Studios
Czechoslovak multilingual films
Czechoslovak romantic drama films
Czechoslovak black-and-white films
1936 multilingual films
1930s Czech films